White Dog (2003) is a 2003 Australian novel by Peter Temple. The fourth novel in the "Jack Irish" series, it won the 2003 Ned Kelly Awards Best Novel for Crime Writing. It was reprinted in the United Kingdom in 2007 by Quercus.

Plot summary
A Melbourne property developer is murdered and his artist ex-girlfriend is the prime suspect. Jack Irish, a lone private investigator, comes in to investigate. In his investigation, he figures out quite the surprise.

Style and subject matter
Reviewer Hutchings describes the novel as "classic detective fiction" typified by its first-person narrative and "engagement with the city". Hutchings also suggests that "the sense of times past" conveyed by Temple in this novel is central to other writers in this genre, such as Raymond Chandler whose hero, Philip Marlowe, is "an anachronistic knight-errant, a defender of past decencies". He suggests that for Temple, along with the Australian crime writers Marele Day, Peter Corris and Cathy Cole, "the detective offers a link to a disappearing working-class, egalitarian Australia".

As in all his Jack Irish novels, Australian Rules Football and horse racing feature in The White Dog.

References

2003 Australian novels
Novels by Peter Temple
Novels set in Melbourne
Ned Kelly Award-winning works
Text Publishing books